John Baldock was an association footballer who played for Queens Park Rangers F.C. between 1913 and 1920, including during the First World War. He made 143 appearances as a half back during his time at the club.

References
General

Specific

Queens Park Rangers F.C. players
English footballers
Association football wing halves
Year of birth missing